National Salvation Army may refer several Chinese armies during the 1931–32 Japanese invasion of Manchuria and the Second Sino-Japanese War:

 Chinese People's National Salvation Army, anti-Japanese
 Heilungkiang National Salvation Army, anti-Japanese
 National Salvation Army (Manchukuo), a Japanese puppet force; see Li Chi-chun
 Northeast Anti-Japanese National Salvation Army, anti-Japanese

See also
 The Salvation Army
 Kuomintang in Burma, military forces organized by Li Mi and formally known as the Yunnan Anti-communist National Salvation Army